Lizalothrips is a genus of thrips in the family Phlaeothripidae.

Species
 Lizalothrips borneoensis
 Lizalothrips luzonensis

References

Phlaeothripidae
Thrips
Thrips genera